François Séguin is a Canadian production designer, art director and set decorator.

Recognition 
 1986 Genie Award for Best Achievement in Art Direction - Night Magic - Nominated
 1987 Genie Award for Best Achievement in Art Direction/Production Design - Exit - Nominated
 1988 Genie Award for Best Achievement in Art Direction/Production Design - Marie in the City (Marie s'en va-t-en ville) - Nominated
 1990 Genie Award for Best Achievement in Art Direction/Production Design - Jesus of Montreal - Won
 1992 Genie Award for Best Achievement in Art Direction/Production Design - Being at Home with Claude - Nominated
 1992 Genie Award for Best Achievement in Art Direction/Production Design - Léolo - Nominated
 1992 Genie Award for Best Achievement in Art Direction/Production Design - La Sarrasine - Nominated
 1996 Gemini Award for Best Production Design or Art Direction - Million Dollar Babies - Nominated
 1999 Jutra Award for Best Art Direction - Le Violon rouge - Won (shared with Renée April)
 1999 Genie Award for Best Achievement in Art Direction/Production Design -The Red Violin (Le Violon rouge) - Won
 2000 Genie Award for Best Achievement in Art Direction/Production Design - Memories Unlocked (Souvenirs intimes) -  Won
 2001 Genie Award for Best Achievement in Art Direction/Production Design -  Possible Worlds - Won (shared with Daniéle Rouleau)
 2003 Genie Award for Best Achievement in Art Direction/Production Design - Come l'America - Won
 2004 Directors Guild of Canada DGC Team Award - The Barbarian Invasions - Won (shared with Denys Arcand, Hélène Grimard, Caroline Alder, Christian Fluet)
 2004 Directors Guild of Canada DGA Craft Award for Outstanding Achievement in Production Design - Feature Film - The Barbarian Invasions - Nominated
 2007 Genie Award for Best Achievement in Art Direction/Production Design - Angel's Rage (La Rage de l'ange) - Nominee

External links 
 
 

Canadian art directors
Canadian production designers
Canadian set decorators
Year of birth missing (living people)
Living people
Best Art Direction/Production Design Genie and Canadian Screen Award winners